The University of the Balearic Islands (UIB) is a Balearic Spanish university, founded in 1978 and located in Palma on the island of Majorca. The university is funded by the autonomous Government of the Balearic Islands.

History
This college was named after the philosopher and writer Ramon Llull (1232–1315). It operated until 1835 when it was closed following intense debate.

After 1835, students from the Balearic Islands attended university in mainland Spain, in Cervera and subsequently in Barcelona. There was no higher education institution in the Balearic Islands until 1949, when the Estudi General Lul·lià was reinstituted under the auspices of the University of Barcelona. This initially offered courses in philosophy and philology, which were recognized by the University of Barcelona. The faculties of Science and Arts were added in 1972 (attached to the Autonomous University of Barcelona and to the University of Barcelona respectively), followed by the Faculty of Law.

The faculties of the Estudi General Lul·lià were separated from their sponsoring universities in 1978, forming the University of Palma.

Work on a new campus began in 1983, on the road from Palma to Valldemossa. This was a controversial choice; there was an alternative location near to the original Faculty of Sciences in Palma. In 1998 additional sites were opened in Ibiza and in Alaior, Menorca.

In 1985 the name was changed to the current University of the Balearic Islands.

The School of Tourism was added in 1993, the Faculty of Education in 1992, and the School of Psychology and the Polytechnic School in 2000.

Since 1996 the University has been funded by the Government of the Balearic Islands.

Rectors
 Antoni Roig Muntaner: 1979-1981 (Professor of Physical Chemistry)
 Antoni Ribera i Blancafort: 1981-1982
 Nadal Batle i Nicolau: 1982-1995
 Llorenç Huguet: 1995-2003
 Avel·lí Blasco: 2003-2007 (Professor of Administrative Law)
 Montserrat Casas Ametller: 2007-2013 (Professor of Atomic, Molecular and Nuclear Physics)
 Llorenç Huguet: 2013-2021 (Professor of Computational Sciences)
 Jaume Carot: 2021-

Campus 
Construction of the UIB campus began in 1983 on private land located next to the Valldemossa road, between the former possessions of Ca's Jai and Son Lledó, in the municipality of Palma. This decision led to the separation of the university from the city. For a long time, the only way to access the campus was by car or by the  bus service from Palma. The road was later improved, speeding up traffic coming from the capital and providing a pedestrian and bicycle lane. In 2005, work began on a Metro line to the train station in central Palma. The Metro was operational in April 2007 and was the first line of its kind in the Balearic Islands.

The campus has been fully operational since 1993. In that year, all Palma urban area studies were centralised at the University of the Balearic Islands. Currently all the administrative services and faculties are located on the campus, although the Sa Riera building in Palma still remains. Buildings on the campus are named after important figures in Balearic society including Ramon Llull, Mathieu Orfila, Anselm Turmeda, Gaspar Melchor de Jovellanos and Arxiduc Lluís Salvador.

The University also has campuses in Ibiza and in Alaior, Menorca. These locations provide tuition in Business Administration and Management, Law, Nursing, Education and Tourism.

Rapid transit line
The university campus is connected with the city center through the Palma metro line M1 (13 minutes) and the bus line 19 (22 minutes).

The UIB metro station was inaugurated on April 25, 2007, but was closed later that year due to structural problems caused by flooding. Nowadays, it operates with regularity every 15 minutes.

Faculties and schools
Faculty of Economics and Enterprise, studies administration, business management and economics.
Faculty of Education, studies teaching (all specialities), social education, education and psychopedagogy.
Faculty of Law
Faculty of Medicine 
Faculty of Nursing and Physiotherapy
Faculty of Philosophy and Art, studies: philosophy, English philology, Catalan philology, Hispanic philology, geography, history, art history and social work.
Faculty of Psychology
Faculty of Science, studies biology, biochemistry, physics, chemistry, agricultural engineering, speciality hortofructiculture and gardening.
Faculty of Tourism
Higher Polytechnic School, studies technical architecture, computer engineering, technical engineering computer systems, technical engineering computing management, telecommunications engineering, speciality telematics, industrial engineering, speciality industrial electronics and mathematics.

The faculties and schools are divided into autonomous departments, which are divided into subject areas. Each faculty is headed by a dean and each department by a director.

Also on the campus are the Institute of Educational Sciences, for teacher training, the Cultural Activities Service, which organizes the Open University, a student residence (Bartomeu Rosselló-Pòrcel) and a restaurant.

The UIB also has University Schools Adscritas, private establishments offering university degrees recognized by the University of the Balearic Islands (which are valid throughout Spain). The University Schools Adscritas are:

University School Alberta Giménez. Studies teaching (all specialties), Communications and journalism.
University School of Industrial Relations. Studies industrial relations.
University School of Tourism's Island Council of Ibiza and Formentera. Studies tourism.
University School of Tourism Felipe Moreno. Studies tourism.

Links with other universities
The UIB belongs to the Xarxa Vives d'Universitats and Grupo 9 networks of universities. It has signed cooperation agreements with most Spanish universities and with research centers in Europe, America, Africa and Asia. Students from the United Kingdom and United States can study at the UIB under the International Students Exchange Program.

Languages
The working languages of the UIB are Catalan, Spanish and English.

Notable professors
 Francesc de Borja Moll, philologist.
 Camilo José Cela Conde, son of Camilo José Cela, writer and professor of Philosophy of Law, Morality and Policy.
 , historian, economist and adviser to the Bank of Spain.

Notable students
 Francesc Antich Oliver (born 1958), former president of the Government of the Balearic Islands.
 Alejandra Forlán (born 1974), Uruguayan psychologist, lecturer, and activist.
  (born 1956), former president of the Government of the Balearic Islands.
 Antumi Toasijé (born 1969), historian.

See also
 Vives Network
 List of medieval universities
 List of universities in Spain
 Palma

External links

 University of the Balearic Islands Website
 UIB Campus View in Google Maps

 
1978 establishments in Spain
Universities and colleges in Spain
Educational institutions established in 1978
University
University